The 2016 Türk Telecom İzmir Cup was a professional tennis tournament played on hard courts. It was the ninth edition of the tournament which is part of the 2016 ATP Challenger Tour. It took place in İzmir, Turkey between 19 and 25 September 2016.

Singles main-draw entrants

Seeds

 1 Rankings are as of September 12, 2016.

Other entrants
The following players received wildcards into the singles main draw:
  Anıl Yüksel
  Cem İlkel
  Muhammet Haylaz
  Altuğ Çelikbilek

The following players received entry from the qualifying draw:
  Tallon Griekspoor
  Vladyslav Manafov
  Kevin Griekspoor
  Vitaly Kozyukov

Champions

Singles

 Marsel İlhan def.   Cem İlkel, 6–2, 6–4.

Doubles

 Marco Chiudinelli /  Marius Copil def.  Sadio Doumbia /  Calvin Hemery, 6–4, 6–4.

External links
Official Website

Turk Telecom Izmir Cup
2016 Türk Telecom İzmir Cup
2016 in Turkish tennis